Woodvale is a community comprising two neighbourhoods within the north-central portion of Mill Woods in the City of Edmonton, Alberta, Canada. Neighbourhoods within the community include Greenview and Hillview. 

The community is represented by the Woodvale Community League, established in 1980.

See also 
 Edmonton Federation of Community Leagues

References

External links 
Woodvale Community League

Neighbourhoods in Edmonton